Jim Rooney (born September 9, 1968) is an American former professional soccer player who played as both a midfielder and a striker. He is currently the head coach of National Premier Soccer League team Boca Raton FC.

Early life
Jim Rooney was born in The Bronx, New York City.

Playing career

College
Rooney played college soccer at Fordham University and C.W. Post. At C.W. Post, he played with the Pioneers. He currently holds the school's record for most goals in a single season: 21.

Professional
Rooney began his professional career in 1994 with the Long Island Rough Riders. he later played in Major League Soccer for the MetroStars, the Miami Fusion and the New England Revolution, making a total of 116 appearances. Rooney then returned to the Long Island Rough Riders in June 2004. In 1998, he scored a goal on loan from the MetroStars to the Staten Island Vipers.

Coaching career
Rooney was hired as assistant coach for Fort Lauderdale Strikers of the North American Soccer League on February 4, 2011. In February 2012, it was announced that Rooney would be joining the staff of Richie Williams and the United States men's national under-17 soccer team.

In January, 2016, Rooney was hired as Assistant Coach for the Jacksonville Armada FC of the North American Soccer League under Head Coach Tony Meola.

In January 2017,Boca Raton FC announced the hiring of Jim Rooney. Rooney will lead Boca Raton FC during the 2018 season.

References

http://www.bocaratonfc.com/jim-rooney-tapped-as-boca-raton-fc-head-coach/

External links
Jim Rooney

1968 births
Living people
American soccer players
Long Island Rough Riders players
New York Red Bulls players
Staten Island Vipers players
Miami Fusion players
New England Revolution players
Major League Soccer players
Major League Soccer All-Stars
Soccer players from New York (state)
Association football midfielders
Fort Lauderdale Strikers coaches
National Premier Soccer League coaches
Boca Raton FC